Qualifying for the 2019 Rugby World Cup for European Rugby began in September 2016, where 5 teams are competing for one direct qualification spot into the final tournament, and a further 26 teams competing, alongside the initial 5 teams, for a place in the Europe/Oceania play-off and or repechage.

The qualification process came to a chaotic conclusion when 3 of the 5 teams in the 2017 and 2018 editions of the Rugby Europe Championship were effectively disqualified for fielding ineligible players. As a result, Russia qualified for the World Cup and Germany advanced to a playoff against Portugal for a place in the repechage process.

Format
The Rugby Europe Championship, controlled by Rugby Europe, is the regional qualification tournament for Rugby World Cup 2019, with the Championship, Trophy and Conference 1 and 2 being involved in the process.

The 2016–17 Rugby Europe International Championships form the majority of qualification matches for the European region. The respective winners of Round 1A and 1B, Rugby Europe Conference 2 North and South, will progress to the Round 1 Final. The overall winner of Round 1, will advance to the Round 3, where they will play against the winner of Round 2, Conference 1. The winner of Round 3 will play against the winner of the 2016–17 Rugby Europe Trophy tournament in the Round 4 Final, where the winner of that final will parachute down to Round 6 - the European Final play-off.

The winner of Round 5, which is an aggregate table of the 2017 and 2018 Rugby Europe Championship's, will qualify for the World Cup as Europe 1, the runner-up will advance to Round 6.

Round 6 will see the winner of Round 4 and the runner-up of Round 5 face against each other in a one-off play-off match, the higher ranked team hosting at the time of teams decided, to earn the right to progress to a home and away Cross-Regional play-off series against the third placed team from Oceania, Oceania 3.

Entrants
Thirty one teams competed during for the 2019 Rugby World Cup – European qualification; teams world rankings are prior to the first European qualification match on 3 September 2016.

Round 1: Rugby Europe Conference 2

Round 1A: North

Round 1B: South

Round 1 Final
Hungary, as winners, qualify for round 3.

Round 2: Rugby Europe Conference 1

Round 2A: North

Round 2B: South

Round 2 Final
The Czech Republic, as winners, qualify for round 3.

Round 3
The Czech Republic, as winners, qualify for the final of round 4.

Round 4

Round 4A: Rugby Europe Trophy

Round 4 Final
This fixture, unlike previous knock out fixtures, doubles as part of the Rugby Europe Trophy competition. 
Portugal, as winners, advance to round 6.

Round 5

Round 5A: Rugby Europe Championship

Table
For the Rugby Europe Championship teams, results are considered on a 2-year aggregate from the 2017 and 2018 seasons (excluding matches involving Georgia, who had already qualified). The winner advanced to the Rugby World Cup and the runner-up advanced to the Round 6 play-off.

World Rugby received complaints against all five teams of fielding ineligible players, in breach of Regulation 8, during the qualification process. The neutral panel cleared Germany and Russia of the alleged ineligible players, but found Belgium, Romania and Spain guilty of breaching Regulation 8. The panel determined that each nation would be deducted 5 points for each game they had fielded an ineligible player, regardless of if more than one ineligible player had been fielded. The investigation found that Belgium and Romania had fielded ineligible players 6 times (a deduction of 30 points) and Spain 8 times (a deduction of 40 points) during the qualification process. This meant, with the deducted points for the respective nations, Russia would qualify ahead of Romania and Germany would advance to the play-offs ahead of Spain. On 29 May 2018, it was confirmed that both Romania and Spain had appealed the decision. On 6 June, the appeal failed and the decision was upheld meaning Russia was confirmed as Europe 1 and qualified for the World Cup, whilst Germany advanced to round 6.

Matches

Round 6: Final play-off
Germany, as winners, advance to the Europe/Oceania play-off.

See also
 2016–17 Rugby Europe International Championships
 2017–18 Rugby Europe International Championships

References

External links
  "Regional qualification process set for Rugby World Cup 2019" (World Rugby)

2019
European
2016–17 in European rugby union
2017–18 in European rugby union